Justice Daniels may refer to:

Charles Daniels (New York politician) (1825–1897), justice of the New York Supreme Court, and ex officio a judge of the New York Court of Appeals
Charles W. Daniels (1943–2019), associate justice of the New Mexico Supreme Court

See also
Justice Daniel (disambiguation)
Daniels (disambiguation)